The 1963 World Series was the championship series of Major League Baseball's (MLB) 1963 season. The 60th edition of the World Series, it was a best-of-seven playoff that matched the American League (AL) champion and two-time defending World Series champion New York Yankees against the National League (NL) champion Los Angeles Dodgers; the Dodgers swept the Series in four games to secure their second championship title in five years, and their third in franchise history. Dodgers starting pitchers Sandy Koufax, Don Drysdale, and Johnny Podres, and ace reliever Ron Perranoski combined to give up only four runs in four games. The dominance of the Dodgers pitchers was so complete that at no point in any of the four games did the Yankees have the lead. New York was held to a .171 team batting average, the lowest ever for the Yankees in the postseason. Koufax was named the World Series Most Valuable Player.

This was the first time that the Yankees were swept in a World Series in four straight (the 1922 World Series had one tie).

Of the Los Angeles Dodgers' five World Series championships since the opening of Dodger Stadium, this was the only one won at Dodger Stadium. Also, of the seven championships from the Dodgers franchise, it remains the only one won at home. Their 2020 title was won as the "home team" albeit as part of the neutral site World Series in Arlington, Texas.

This series was also the first meeting between teams from New York City and Los Angeles for a major professional sports championship. Seven more such meetings have followed with three more times each in the World Series and the NBA Finals, and the 2014 Stanley Cup Finals.

Background

Yankees
Despite injuries that limited Mickey Mantle to just 65 games, the Yankees went 104–57 to win their fourth straight American League pennant—this one by  games. Catcher Elston Howard (.287 BA, 28 HRs, 85 RBI) won the MVP Award, while Joe Pepitone, Roger Maris, and Tom Tresh also topped the 20 home run mark. Their pitching was anchored by Whitey Ford (24 wins, 2.74 ERA) and Jim Bouton (21 wins, 2.53 ERA).

Dodgers
The Dodgers' road to the World Series was much more challenging. After blowing a four-game lead with seven to play in 1962, the Dodgers again built a lead in 1963. On August 21, the Dodgers beat the Cardinals 2–1 in 16 innings to take a  game lead.  When they went to St. Louis for a three-game series on September 16, their lead was one game over the Cardinals, who had won 19 of 20 games. Sports fans around the country were saying how the Dodgers were going to blow it again. But the Dodgers swept the three games from the Cardinals to move four games ahead with nine to play; a 4–1 win over the Mets clinched the pennant in the season's 158th game.

Summary

Matchups

Game 1

Sandy Koufax started it off with a record 15-strikeout performance in Game 1 to outduel the Yankees' ace left-hander Whitey Ford. The 15 strikeouts bested fellow Dodgers pitcher Carl Erskine's mark in 1953 by one, and would be surpassed by Bob Gibson in 1968 with 17. Koufax also tied a World Series record when he fanned the first five Yankees he faced.

Clete Boyer was the only Yankees regular not to strike out. Mickey Mantle, Tom Tresh and Tony Kubek each struck out twice, and Bobby Richardson struck out three times—his only three-strikeout game in 1448 regular season or World Series games. Koufax also struck out three pinch-hitters, including Harry Bright to end the game.

Ford set the Dodgers down in order in the first inning, but got into trouble in the second inning. With one out, right fielder Frank Howard doubled into left center field. A single by first baseman Bill Skowron plated Howard to give the Dodgers a 1–0 lead. Second baseman Dick Tracewski's single preceded a three-run home run by catcher John Roseboro to give the Dodgers a 4–0 lead.

The Dodgers upped the lead to 5-0 when Skowron singled home Willie Davis with two outs in the third inning against Ford, who went just five innings.

The Yankees scored twice in the eighth inning when Tony Kubek singled with one out and Tom Tresh homered with two outs to cut the lead to 5–2.

Game 2

Willie Davis doubled in two runs in the first inning, former Yankee Bill Skowron homered in the fourth, and Tommy Davis had two triples, including an RBI triple in the eighth to lead the Dodger offense. Yankee starter Al Downing, who would take the loss, went only five innings and charged with three runs. Ralph Terry, in relief, allowed Davis's RBI triple. Dodger manager Walt Alston went with #3 starter Johnny Podres over #2 starter Don Drysdale because he was left-handed and Yankee Stadium was favorable to left-handed pitchers. Podres delivered a six-hitter through  innings; ace reliever Ron Perranoski, also a left-hander, got the last two outs and the save, and the Dodgers headed home with 2–0 Series lead.

Game 3

Don Drysdale pitched a masterful three-hitter at Dodger Stadium in his complete-game win. Manager Walter Alston called Drysdale's performance "one of the greatest pitched games I ever saw." Jim Bouton, making his first World Series start, dueled Drysdale throughout, permitting only four hits in seven innings for a losing cause. The lone run of the game came in the bottom of the first on a Jim Gilliam walk, a wild pitch and a single by Tommy Davis. Gilliam almost scored again in the eighth off Hal Reniff, but was caught in an attempt to steal third. The final out came on Joe Pepitone's drive that backed Dodger right fielder Ron Fairly up against the bullpen gate to make the catch of a ball that would have been a home run in Yankee Stadium. Tony Kubek had two of the Yankees' three hits, but none of the hits were extra-base hits.

Game 4

Aces were on the mound again in a game 1 rematch between Whitey Ford and Sandy Koufax. This time, it was a pitcher's duel. The Dodgers scored first in the bottom of the fifth on a monumental Frank Howard home run into the second (Loge) level at Dodger Stadium. The Yankees tied it on a Mickey Mantle home run in the top of the seventh. But in the bottom of the inning, Gilliam hit a high hopper to Yankee third baseman Clete Boyer; Boyer leaped to make the grab, and fired an accurate throw to first base. But first baseman Joe Pepitone lost Boyer's peg in the white-shirted crowd background; the ball struck Pepitone in the arm and rolled down the right field line, allowing Gilliam to scamper all the way to third base. He then scored a moment later on Willie Davis' sacrifice fly. Sandy Koufax went on to hold the Yankees for the final two innings for a 2–1 victory and the Dodgers' third world championship. To date, this is the only time the Dodgers have won the deciding game of a World Series at home.  (The Dodgers won the 2020 World Series in Game 6 while they were designated as the home team, but the game was played at a neutral site, Globe Life Field in Arlington, Texas, as a result of the COVID-19 global pandemic.)

The World Series Most Valuable Player Award went to Sandy Koufax, who started two of the four games and had two complete game victories. When the award was given to Koufax at a luncheon in New York City, he was presented with a new car—while the luncheon was taking place, a New York City police officer put a parking violation ticket on the car's windshield.

Composite line score

1963 World Series (4–0): Los Angeles Dodgers (N.L.) over New York Yankees (A.L.)

In popular culture
 In the 1986 novel Replay by Ken Grimwood, the protagonist bets his life savings on a Dodgers sweep, knowing they will win. His winnings total more than $12 million, at the apparent odds of 100–1, with Grimwood referring to it as "one of the great upsets in baseball history".
 This is the World Series that Jack Nicholson's character R.P. McMurphy lobbies unsuccessfully to watch on television (and subsequently "announces" by imagining the action) in Miloš Forman's 1975 film One Flew Over the Cuckoo's Nest. He imagines quite a different scene than what occurred, however, as he describes Richardson, Tresh, and Mantle knocking Koufax out of the box. In reality, the Yankees never led at any time in the Series, and only once in the entire Series (and that only for a half-inning) were the Yankees and Dodgers tied at a score other than 0–0. A brief clip of Ernie Harwell's NBC Radio broadcast of Game 2 can be heard in the film.
 On March 21, 1964, The Joey Bishop Show had lead character Joey Barnes host members of the 1963 Los Angeles Dodgers on his variety show. Don Drysdale sang "I Left My Heart in San Francisco," Joey had fun with 6'7" Frank Howard, and all the Dodgers sang a parody of "High Hopes" in which they celebrated their victory over the Yankees. The lyrics to this parody were written by Sammy Cahn, who also wrote the original lyrics.

Broadcasting
 This was longtime Yankees announcer Mel Allen's 22nd and final World Series broadcast. Allen was suffering from an attack of severe laryngitis at the time of the Series, and while doing play-by-play for NBC television during Game 4 his voice gave out completely in the bottom of the eighth inning, requiring Vin Scully to take over for the remainder of the game. (The following year—Allen's last with the Yankees—he would be passed over for the Series assignment in favor of boothmate Phil Rizzuto.)
 Game 4 was the highest-rated sports broadcast of 1963, per Nielsen ratings. Of all televised World Series games, its 39.5 rating (percentage of all U.S. television-equipped households that watched the game) has only been surpassed by Game 7 in  (39.6) and Game 6 in  (40.0).

See also
1963 Japan Series

Sources

References

External links

World Series
World Series
Los Angeles Dodgers postseason
New York Yankees postseason
World Series
World Series
October 1963 sports events in the United States
Baseball competitions in Los Angeles
Baseball competitions in New York City
1963 in sports in California